Unholy Crusade is the third album by Swedish black metal band Lord Belial. It was released in 1999 by No Fashion Records. The tenth and last track on this album is the second part of the twenty-minute-long song "Realm of A Thousand Burning Souls" from their second album named Enter The Moonlight Gate.

Track listing 
 "Summon The Legions" – 1:08
 "Unholy Crusade" – 3:47
 "War of Hate" – 6:34
 "Lord of Evil Spirits" – 4:37
 "Death Is the Gate" – 10:15
 "Bleed on the Cross" – 2:59
 "Divide Et Impera" – 8:13
 "Master of Destruction" – 4:29
 "Night Divine" – 3:41
 "And Heaven Eternally Burns (Realm of a Thousand Burning Souls, Part II)" – 8:29

Credits 
 Thomas Backelin – Vocals, guitars
 Niclas Andersson – Guitars, vocals
 Anders Backelin – Bass
 Micke Backelin – Drums

1999 albums
Lord Belial albums